Danny Michael is an American sound engineer. He was nominated for an Academy Award in the category Best Sound for the film Mississippi Burning. He has worked on nearly 90 films since 1976.

Selected filmography
 Mississippi Burning (1988)

References

External links

Year of birth missing (living people)
Living people
American audio engineers
Best Sound BAFTA Award winners